Cernea is a genus of achilid planthoppers in the family Achilidae. There is at least one described species in Cernea, C. insularis.

References

Further reading

 
 
 
 
 

Achilidae
Auchenorrhyncha genera